A traffic separation scheme (or 'TSS') is an area in the sea where navigation of ships is highly regulated. Each TSS is designed to create lanes in the water with ships in a specific lane all travelling in (roughly) the same direction.

A TSS is typically created in locations with large numbers of ship movements and vessels travelling in different directions and where there might otherwise be a high risk of collisions. Details of traffic separation schemes and similar routing-systems can be found on Admiralty charts.

In the list below, where a TSS or routing scheme is not governed by the IMO (IMO), then the governing body is mentioned in brackets.

History
Internationally agreed traffic separation schemes were first adopted by the IMCO (precursor to the IMO) in November 1973.

Atlantic Ocean: East

Europe
 Approaches to Vigo  (Spain)
 Cape Roca or Cabo da Roca
 Cape St. Vincent or Cabo de São Vicente
 Banco del Hoyo
 Canary Islands
 off Finisterre
 before the coast of Ouessant (in English: (Ushant).
 around the Isles of Scilly, off the coast at Lands End
 Fastnet Rock, south of Ireland

Irish Sea
 Off Tuskar Rock, named after the lighthouse on one of the islands forming Tuskar rock
 Off Smalls
 Holyhead Harbour, governed by Stena Line Ferries/
 Off Skerries at the northern coast of Northern Ireland
 Liverpool Bay
 Approaches to Dublin, governed by the Government of Ireland
 In the North Channel
 Off Neist Point

English Channel
The English Channel connects the Atlantic Ocean with the Southern part of the North Sea and is one of the busiest shipping areas in the world with ships going in numerous direction: some are passing through in transit from the Southwest to Northeast (or vice versa) and others serving the many ports around the English Channel, including ferries crossing the Channel. In the English Channel several TSS schemes are in operation:

 Dover Straits TSS
 Casquets TSS near Alderney
 West Hinder TSS off the Belgium coast.

Southern North-Sea
The Southern North Sea overlaps the TSS mentioned in the English Channel above
 Approaches to the Humber River
 Sunk and Northern approaches to the Thames Estuary
 North Hinder TSS
 Approaches to Hook of Holland

Russia and Norway
TSS's in these areas aren't governed by the IMO but by either the government of Russia (marked: R) or the Norwegian government (marked N)

 off Mys Zimnegorskiy (R)
 off Ostrov Sosnovets (R)
 off Ostrova Ponoyskiye Ludki (R)
 off Tersko-Orlovskiy (R)
 off Svyatonosskiy Poluostrov (R)
 Entrance to Kol’skiy Zaliv (R)
 Proliv Karskiye Vorota (R)
 off Makkaur (N)
 off Cape Nordkinn (N)
 off Nordkapp (N)
 Coast of Western Norway (IMO)
 Coast of Southern Norway (IMO)
 4 different TSS around Oslo Fjord  (N)
 Vardø to Røst (IMO)
 off the Southwest coast of Iceland (IMO)

Baltic Sea
Most TSS's in the Baltic Sea are governed by the IMO, but some are the responsibility of the local country.

 Sea of Åland
 Seskar Island (R)
 Sommers Island
 Gogland or Hogland Island
 Rodsher Island
 Kalbådagrund Lighthouse
 Porkkala Lighthouse
 Hanko Peninsula
 Hiiumaa Peninsula
 Approaches to Stockholm, Sandhamn entrance (Sweden)
 Hoburgs Bank, North and South
 West Klintehamn
 South Midsjöbankarna 
 Adlergrund 
 Slupska Bank
 Öland Island
 Bornholmsgat
 North of Rügen
 South of Gedser
 Between Korsør and Sprogø
 Hatter Barn
 Skagen West
 Skagen East
 Fladen
 Lilla Middelgrund
 Entrance to the Sound
 In The Sound
 Falsterbo
 Kiel Lighthouse
 Zatoka Gdanska or Gdańsk Bay (Poland)

North Sea: Denmark, Germany, The Netherlands
In the area of the North Sea which lies North of the earlier mentioned Dover Straits several TSS's are in place to manage the traffic to and from some of the busiest ports in the world such as: Port of Rotterdam, Bremerhaven, Port of Amsterdam, Antwerp etc.
All of these TSS's and routing-schemes are governed by the IMO

 German Bight, Western approach
 Approaches to the River Elbe
 Jade approach
 Terschelling - German Bight
 Vlieland North
 Vlieland
 Texel
 Brown Ridge
 West Friesland
 East Friesland
 Botney Ground

Mediterranean Sea and Black Sea
Numerous TSS's and similar routing-schemes are active in the Mediterranean Sea, the Black Sea and the waters within this area such as the Adriatic Sea. On the charts of the United Kingdom Hydrographic Office some 56 schemes can be found. Many of these schemes are governed by the local state, such as Italy, Spain, Croatia etc.)

Some of the most important TSS's are mentioned below. A complete list can be retrieved from the Notice 17: TRAFFIC SEPARATION SCHEMES AND INFORMATION CONCERNING ROUTEING SYSTEMS SHOWN ON ADMIRALTY CHARTS

Strait of Gibraltar
 Approaches to Skikda, Algeria  (Algeria)
 Approaches to Barcelona (Spain)
 Approaches to Genova (Italy)
 Approaches to Napoli (Italy)
 TSS in the North Adriatic Sea
 TSS in the Strait of Messina (Italy)
Approach to the Port of Piraeus (Athens, Greece)
Between the Dardanelles and Istanbul including the Bosphorus
 Approaches to the Port of Odessa
 Sevastopol Harbour approaches 
 Western and Eastern approaches to Bur Sa'id (Port Said)

Atlantic Ocean: West
On the Western shores of the Atlantic Ocean are the eastern coasts of North America with the United States of America and Canada. Then there is the Caribbean Sea, the Gulf of Mexico and South America's east coast.

Caribbean Sea and Gulf of Mexico
 Canal de Maracaibo, (Venezuela)
 Golfo de Venezuela or Gulf of Venezuela, (Venezuela)
 off Cabo San Antonio
 off La Tabla
 off Costa de Matanzas, Cuba
 in the Old Bahama Channel
 off Punta Maternillos, Cuba
 off Punta Lucretia, Cuba
 off Cape Maisí, Cuba
 in the approaches of the Port of Veracruz
 in the approaches to Galveston Bay, (IMO with parts by the US Government)

East Coast of North America
 the approaches of Cape Fear River
 the approaches of Chesapeake Bay
 Chesapeake Bay, off Smith Point, (US government)
 off Delaware Bay
 off New York
 the approaches to Narragansett Bay, Rhode Island and Buzzards Bay
 the approaches to Boston, Massachusetts
 the approaches to Portland, Maine
 approaches to Bay of Fundy
 approaches to Halifax Harbor
 approaches to Chedabucto Bay
 Saint Lawrence River and Gulf of Saint Lawrence, (Canada)
 St. George's Bay, (Canada)
 Placentia Bay, (Canada)

Indian Ocean

Indian Ocean: Africa
Apart from the TSS schemes in the Mediterranean to the north, the African continent has only a few TSS schemes around the waters of South Africa:
 approaches to Port Elizabeth (South Africa)
 approaches to Saldanha Bay (South Africa)
 approaches to Table Bay (South Africa)
 Alphard Banks, South of Cape Infanta
 FA Platform, South of Cape St. Blaize (Mossel Bay)

Arabian Peninsula
This covers the Red Sea, Arabian Sea and Persian Gulf. Some 15 TSS schemes can be found in this area: in the Red Sea is traffic using the Suez Channel while in the Persian Gulf much of the traffic comprises the (large) oil and gas tankers to Iran and Iraq. All TSS's here are governed by the IMO, except the Approaches to Yanbu which is the responsibility of the Kingdom of Saudi Arabia.

 Gulf of Suez
 Straits of Tiran
 approaches to Yanbu  (The Royal Commission for Jubail and Yanbu’, Kingdom of Saudi Arabia)
 in Bab-el-Mandeb
 West and South of Hanish al Kubra (Hanish Islands)
 East of Zuqar Island (Jabal al-Tair Island)
 off Ra’s al Hadd
 off Ra’s al Kûh  (which forms the border of the Persian Gulf)
 Strait of Hormuz
 Tonb-Forur
 off Mînâ’al Ahmadî
 between Zaqqum and Umm Shaif oil-fields
 approaches to Ra’s Tannûrah
 approaches to Ra’s al Ju’aymah (Saudi Arabia)
 between Zuluf and Marian Oilfields

Central Indian Ocean
The Indian Ocean region links in the West with the (above) area of the Arabian Sea and the African continent and in the East it borders with the Pacific Ocean. Apart from schemes in these border-areas only two TSS's are mentioned around India and Sri Lanka:

 off Mumbai, India, governed by the Director General Shipping, India
 off Dondra Head, Sri Lanka

Malacca Strait, Singapore Strait and Sumatra
On the Eastern borders of the Indian Ocean are the Malacca Strait, Singapore Strait and the waters around the Indonesian island of Sumatra. This is a very busy shipping area and also very dangerous (see also this section).

 Singapore Harbour area - the waters around Singapore are part of two TSS schemes  governed by the Maritime and Port Authority of Singapore
 One Fathom Bank
 Port Klang to Port Dickson
 Port Dickson to Tanjung Kling
 Malacca to Iyu Kecil (Karimun Regency)
 Three TSS in the Singapore Straits: Main Strait, Saint John's Island and off Changi
 Horsburgh Lighthouse at the entrance of the Singapore Strait

Pacific Ocean

China Seas
Some 25 TSS schemes are in operation in and around the China Seas. Shipping is very busy around Hong Kong, the mainland of South-East China and around Taiwan.

Some of the most important TSS schemes in this area:
 East Lamma Channel off Lamma Island, Hong Kong
 Tathong Channel, Hong Kong
 Cheung Chau North and West (SAR Hong Kong) Dangan Shuida and Lan Tau channel (SAR Hong Kong) Qingzhou, (China). only applies to high-speed craft
 approaches to Shanghai, (China) Chengshan Jiao (IMO) approaches to Dalian, (China) approaches to Caofeidian, (China) Taichung
 Chilung
 Taipei
 approaches to Kaohsiung, (Kaohsiung Harbour Bureau) North Eastern approaches to Qiongzhou Haixia, (China)Japan
In Japan there are 5 TSS's all governed by the Japanese government.  Apart from these mandatory schemes there are also voluntary and recommended schemes. These are not shown on Admiralty Charts and (thus) not shown in this overview

 Kurushima Kaikyo off Ōshima
 North, South and East Bisan Seto; approaches to Mizushima and Uko
 Akashi Kaikyō
 Irago Suido
 Na Ka-no-Se

Korea and Russia (Pacific Coast)
In (North) Korean and Pacific Russian waters some 35 schemes are in operation with only 5 of them being governed by the IMO. All major ports in this area have a TSS in operation.  In North Korea none of the TSS schemes are IMO schemes; only locally governed by the North Korean central government. Below an overview of the IMO schemes and some of the most important locally governed schemes:

 Nampho
 Wonsan
 Hong Do
 Chongjin
 Najin
 approaches to Vladivostok, (Russia) approaches to Zaliv Nakhodka (to Kozmino), (IMO) off Mys Ostrovnoy, (IMO) off Mys Anvina, (IMO) Proliv Bussol’, (IMO) Chetvertyy Kuril’skiy Proliv, (IMO) approaches to Avachinskaya Guba, (Avachinsky, Kamchatka Peninsula)

Philippines, Borneo and Indonesia
There are six TSS's around the Philippines and one in Malaysia. None of them are governed by the IMO:

 Isla Verde Passage or Verde Island Passage, (Government of Philippines) approaches to Manila Bay, (Government of Philippines) approaches to Manila Harbour, (Government of Philippines) Cebu, Mactan Channel, (Government of Philippines) Malapascua Island, (Government of Philippines) Batangas, (Government of Philippines) approaches to Bintulu Port, (Government of Malaysia)Australia and Papua New Guinea
In this area there are 5 TSS's in operation: two in the Bass Strait, governed by the IMO and three leading to Australian ports, governed by Australia.

 South of Wilsons Promontory in the Bass Strait
 In the Bass Strait
 Port Jackson, (Australia) Port Darwin, (Australia) Botany Bay, (Australia)Aleutian Islands, Alaska, US West Coast, Canada and Mexico
On the East side of the Pacific Ocean the TSS's are divided in two groups. The North side includes the West coast of Mexico and everything to its North. The other group are formed by the West coast of Central and South America.

The TSS's in the far North around the Aleutian Islands and Alaska are not put in place because of the high density of shipping but the nature of the ships and the vulnerability of the area.

The TSS schemes are:

 Prince William Sound and Valdez Arm
 Strait of Juan de Fuca and approaches
 Puget Sound and areas around it
 Vancouver Harbour, (Canada) off San Francisco
 San Francisco Harbour and inner approaches, (USA) Santa Barbara Channel in the approaches to Long Beach, Los Angeles
 approaches to Manzanillo, (API Manzanillo)''
 approaches to Salina Cruz

Pacific: Central and South America
The IMO governs 16 TSS schemes on the Pacific side of Central and South America:

 landfall and approaches to Talara Bay, Peru
 landfall and approaches to Bahia de Paita, Peru
 landfall of Puerto Salaverry, Peru
 landfall and approaches to Chimbote or Ferrol Bay, Peru
 approaches to Callao, Peru
 landfall and approaches to San Martín
 landfall and approaches to San Nicolas Bay 
 landfall and approaches to Puerto Ilo
 landfall and approaches to Arica
 landfall and approaches to Iquique
 landfall and approaches to Antofagasta
 in the approaches to Quintero Bay
 in the approaches to Valparaíso
 in the approaches to Bay of Concepción
 in the approaches to Bahía San Vicente, Chile
 in the approaches to Puntas Arenas

Sources and references

Law of the sea
Navigation
Maritime safety